Sinlung, sometimes called Chhinlung, Khur or Khul, is the ancestral home of the Chin/Kuki/Mizo people (Zohnahthlâk mi/people ). The Mizo, Hmars, and other Zo people trace their origin to Chhinlung / Sinlung. Most of the tribes/clans in Mizoram and its neighbouring regions have talk about Chhinlung as their most ancient origin, which is orally told by the ancient Mizo and other sub-tribe/clan. Numerous poems, songs and tales about this place have been made and handed down from generation to generation. Folklore about Sinlung describes it as a city-state where a form of democracy was in existence, and which engaged in many wars with its neighbours. There are many stories of bravery and courage, and here the tribe started the practice of headhunting.

Location and origin
Historians differ on the issue of the location of Sinlung and the origin of the name. Several theories and views regarding the origin and location have been put forward. Historian Hranglien Songate believed it to have been in South West China, possibly in the present Dali or Silung of Yunnan Province of today's China. Other possibilities are Xining in central China or the present Sinlung, located near the Yalong River in Sichuan Province of China.

Hmars leave Sinlung
The Hmars, the majority of whom now belong to a tribe of the Mizo people, eventually left Sinlung, for reasons which are not known for sure, but historians suggest either economic reasons, oppressive Chinese rulers or powerful enemies in the area.

There were successive waves of migrants southward from China before 1000 AD into Southeast Asia. Historian Edward Thomas Williams, writes about the Qin Dynasty who, "violated all the rules of courteous warfare, triumphed and took over the territory and symbols of the rule of the Zhou dynasty (their predecessors)". It is believed that the Hmars might have been moving along with one of these waves towards the south, and eventually into India.

Shan
Hmar folk tales and songs describe the second settlement of the Hmars as being in Shan, which was marked by a time of prosperity and peace. According to Hranglien Songate, a Hmar historian, in Shan their civilisation advanced much farther than Sinlung. Many of the Hmar festivals such as Butukhuonglawm (Spring festival), Lunglâk (Autumn festival) and Sesun (Solemn celebration) have their origin in Shan.

References

External links
Sinlung

Hmar
Culture of Mizoram